Hibbertia lineata is a species of flowering plant in the family Dilleniaceae and is endemic to the south-west of Western Australia. It is a spreading to erect shrub with linear to narrow egg-shaped leaves and yellow flowers, usually with ten stamens arranged on one side of, and leaning over the two densely hairy carpels.

Description
The edges of the leaves are rolled under, obscuring most of the lower surface and the tip of the leaf often curves downwards. There are usually ten stamens, arranged in a single group on one side of, and leaning over the two densely softly-hairy carpels that each contain a two ovules.

Taxonomy
Hibbertia lineata was first formally described in 1845 Ernst Gottlieb von Steudel in Johann Georg Christian Lehmann's  Plantae Preissianae. The specific epithet (lineata) means "marked with straight lines", referring to the leaves.

Distribution and habitat
This hibbertia grows in kwongan and heath, mainly between Wagin and the Dragon Rocks Nature Reserve, but it is also widely in the Avon Wheatbelt Esperance Plains, Jarrah Forest and Mallee biogeographic regions in the south-west of Western Australia.

Conservation status
Hibbertia lineata is classified as "not threatened" by the Western Australian Government Department of Parks and Wildlife.

See also
List of Hibbertia species

References

lineata
Flora of Western Australia
Plants described in 1845
Taxa named by Ernst Gottlieb von Steudel